Marco Caldwell Johnson (born October 25, 1985) is a professional poker player who has won two World Series of Poker bracelets. Johnson also has excelled online in Limit H.O.R.S.E. earning both a World Championship of Online Poker championship among large prizes.

Career highlights
Johnson won the 343-entrant $2,500 Limit Hold'em Six Handed 2013 World Series of Poker Event 48 at a shorthanded final table that included Juha Helppi and Maria Ho, earning a prize of $206,796. Although that was his only bracelet up to that point, it was not Johnson's largest prize. He had finished second to Alexandre Gomes at the 2,317-entrant $2,000 No-Limit Hold'em 2008 World Series of Poker Event 48 for a prize of $491,273. In fact, prior to his first bracelet, he had finished as runner up three times in World Series of Poker events — $2,500 Limit Hold'em Six Handed 2012 World Series of Poker Event 40 and $1,500 Pot Limit Omaha Hi-Low Split-8 or Better 2013 World Series of Poker Event 31. The 2013 bracelet was in the same $2,500 Limit Hold’em Six-Max event that he earned his 2012 runner-up finish in.

On September 15, 2012, Johnson won the $320 buy-in PokerStars 2012 World Championship of Online Poker Limit H.O.R.S.E. Event No. 41 against a field of 598 for a prize of $33,727.20. Johnson's biggest online win came on February 15, 2009 in the $150 + $13 buy-in Full Tilt Poker 200K Guarantee No-limit Hold'em with Rebuys when he defeated a field of 637 who had purchased 1142 rebuys and 547 addons for a prize of $85,481. His biggest online prize came from a 3rd-place finish in the $10,000 + $300 buy-in September 20, 2009 PokerStars World Championship of Online Poker Limit H.O.R.S.E. Event No. 44 that earned him $133,900.

Johnson's residence is in Mexico, where he plays high-stakes online poker. Johnson was inspired to play poker by poker professional and legend Chip Reese, who was a neighbor of his growing up.

World Series of Poker

Notes

External links
Marco Johnson at Hendonmob.com
Marco Johnson at Bluff Magazine
Marco Johnson at Card Player
Marco Johnson at WSOP.com

1985 births
American poker players
World Series of Poker bracelet winners
Living people
Sportspeople from Walnut Creek, California